A constitutional referendum was held in the People's Republic of the Congo on 24 June 1973. The new constitution was approved by 76.7% of voters with an 83.1% turnout.

Results

References

1973 referendums
1973
1973 in the Republic of the Congo
Constitutional referendums in the Republic of the Congo